is a Japanese romance drama film written by Nami Sakkawa and directed by Ryuichi Hiroki, starring Kiko Mizuhara and Honami Sato. The film is based on Ching Nakamura's manga series Gunjō and was released by Netflix on April 15, 2021.

Synopsis
Rei is a lesbian in her late 20s who, upon learning that her former classmate Nanae is suffering brutal domestic violence from her husband, decides to kill him to show her love for Nanae. Nanae is filled with disgust and fear about the murder, but Rei accepts the results of her decision with the sole purpose of saving Nanae. While turning to each other for love, Rei and Nanae find themselves struggling with incompatible emotions.

Cast
 Kiko Mizuhara as Rei Nagasawa
 Sara Minami as young Rei
 Honami Sato as Nanae Shinoda
 Yōko Maki as Mika Oe
 Shunsuke Tanaka as Masato Nagasawa
 Anne Suzuki as Yu Nagasawa
 Shinya Niiro as Kotaro Shinoda
 Tetsushi Tanaka as Yoshio Akiba
 Setsuko Karasuma as Ichiko Oe

Production

Development
In October 2020, it was announced that Netflix is developing a live-action film adaptation of the manga, under the title Ride or Die ( in Japanese) that will premiere worldwide simultaneously spring 2021.

Reception

References

External links
 
 

2021 LGBT-related films
2020s Japanese-language films
Japanese psychological thriller films
Japanese drama films
Japanese LGBT-related films
Japanese-language Netflix original films
Lesbian-related films
Live-action films based on manga
2021 thriller drama films
2021 psychological thriller films